French 75A or French '75 can be used to refer to:   

 The Canon de 75 modèle 1897, an innovative design that introduced, for the first time in field artillery history, a hydro-pneumatic recoil mechanism keeping the gun stable during firing and thus permitting high rates of accurate shell delivery.  Variants and descendants, in the French Army alone, included among many others:                              
Canon de 75 M(montagne) modele 1919 Schneider   
Canon de 75 M(montagne) modele 1928 
 French 75 (cocktail), a cocktail made with gin, champagne and lemon juice.  
 French 75 Bar, a bar in New Orleans, Louisiana, USA
 French 75 (company), a Hollywood cinema company founded by Frank Verpillat
 "French 75" (song), a 1965 song by 'The Champs'
 "French 75" (song), a 2015 song by 'Cane Hill' off the record Cane Hill (EP)

See also

 French (disambiguation)
 75 (disambiguation)